The 1997 NCAA Division I-AA Football Championship Game was a postseason college football game between the Youngstown State Penguins and the McNeese State Cowboys. The game was played on December 20, 1997, and was the first I-AA title game contested at Finley Stadium, home field of the University of Tennessee at Chattanooga. The culminating game of the 1997 NCAA Division I-AA football season, it was won by Youngstown State, 10–9.

Teams
The participants of the Championship Game were the finalists of the 1997 I-AA Playoffs, which began with a 16-team bracket.

Youngstown State Penguins

Youngstown State finished their regular season with a 9–2 record (4–2 in conference). Seeded eighth in the playoffs, the Penguins defeated ninth-seed Hampton, first-seed Villanova, and third-seed Eastern Washington to reach the final. This was the fifth appearance for Youngstown State in a Division I-AA championship game, having won three titles (1991, 1993, and 1994) against one loss (1992).

McNeese State Cowboys

McNeese State finished their regular season with a 10–1 record (6–1 in conference). The Cowboys, seeded sixth, defeated 11-seed Montana, second-seed Western Illinois, and fourth-seed Delaware to reach the final. This was the first appearance for McNeese State in a Division I-AA championship game.

Game summary

Scoring summary

Game statistics

References

Further reading

External links
 1997 McNeese Football National Championship Run Highlights via YouTube
 

Championship Game
NCAA Division I Football Championship Games
McNeese Cowboys football games
Youngstown State Penguins football games
American football competitions in Chattanooga, Tennessee
NCAA Division I-AA Football Championship Game
NCAA Division I-AA Football Championship Game
College football in Tennessee